The Suzuki Boulevard S50 is a motorcycle manufactured by Suzuki and released in 2005 and production stopped in 2009.  It features an 805 cc v-twin engine with four valves per cylinder. It was formerly named the Intruder 1985 - 1991 VS 700 (USA), 1985 VS 750 (worldwide) and VS 800 (1992 - 2004).

Specification
The Boulevard S50's engine is carbureted by a Mikuni BDS36 in the front, and a Mikuni BS36 in the rear, and features wet sump lubrication. It has a ground clearance of 125 mm (4.9 in), and comes in many colours depending upon the model year & country of sale. 

ENGINE & DRIVETRAIN

liquid-cooled 45-degree tandem V-twin

SOHC; 2 intake, 2 exhaust valves; operated by rockers, threaded adjusters

Displacement, bore x stroke: 805cc, 83 x 74.4mm

Compression ratio: 10.0:1

Carburetion: 2, 36mm Mikuni CV

Lubrication: wet sump, 3.5 qt., spin-on filter

Minimum fuel grade: 87 octane

Transmission: wet multiplate clutch; 5 speeds

Final drive: shaft, 3.2:1

CHASSIS

Wet weight: 477 lb., 52% rear wheel

GVWR: 950 lb.

Wheelbase: 61.4 in.

Overall length: 88.8 in.

Rake/trail: 33.25 degrees / 5.71 in. 

Seat height: 27.6 in.

** wire-spoke; 21 x 2.15 front, 15 x 3.00 rear** 1989 -1999

**Front tire: 80/90-21 tube-type** 1989 -1999

Front tire: 100/90/19 tube-type 1985 - 1988 & 2000 - 2009

Rear tire: 140/90-15 tube-type

Front brake: double-action caliper, 11.6-in. disc

Rear brake: drum, rod-operated

Front suspension: 39mm stanchions, 5.1 in, travel

Rear suspension: dual dampers, 3.5 in. travel, adjustment for preload

Fuel capacity: 3.2 gal., Calif. 2.9 gal. (.8 gal reserve)

Inseam equivalent: 31.5 in.

ELECTRICAL & INSTRUMENTATION

Charging output: 252 watts

Battery: 12v, 16AH

Lighting: 55/60-watt 5.7-in. headlight, position lights

Taillight: 1 bulb

Speedometer, odometer, tripmeter; 

Warning lights: neutral, high beam, coolant temperature, oil pressure

PERFORMANCE

Fuel mileage: 37 to 50 mpg, 44.6 mpg average

Average range: 143 miles 

RPM at 60 mph, top gear: 4080

200 yard, top-gear acceleration from 50 mph, terminal speed: 84.8 mph

Quarter-mile acceleration: 13.31 sec., 97.2 mph

References

Boulevard S50
Cruiser motorcycles